Man of Miracles may refer to:

Man of Miracles, the fourth album by the band Styx
Man of Miracles (comics), a character created by Todd McFarlane for the comic book Spawn
The Man Who Could Work Miracles, a 1936 British fantasy-comedy film

See also

Miracle Man (disambiguation)